William Dane was a former Australian professional soccer player who played as a half-back for Australian clubs and the Australia national soccer team. He played in the first Australian National team that toured New Zealand in 1922.

Club career
Dane played for the NSW club Granville Magpies from 1915, less the three years he served in WWI, which included him awarded as top goalscorer in 1920 and won a Premiership title in 1923.

International career
Dane played two international matches with Australia in 1922.

Career statistics

International

References

Australian soccer players
Association football midfielders
Australia international soccer players
Year of birth missing
Year of death missing